The Suicide may refer to:

 The Suicide (play)
 "The Suicide" (Seinfeld)
 Le Suicidé, painting by Manet

See also 
 Suicide (disambiguation)
 "The Suicider", a song by Sentenced from the album Frozen